Dreamstone Moon is an original novel written by Paul Leonard and based on the long-running British science fiction television series Doctor Who. It features the Eighth Doctor and Sam.

External links

1998 British novels
1998 science fiction novels
Eighth Doctor Adventures